Carlow University is a private Catholic university in Pittsburgh, Pennsylvania. It was founded in 1929 by the Sisters of Mercy. Carlow's thirteen athletic teams are the Celtics, a reflection of the university's Irish heritage and roots. In 2017–2018, the student body was 84% women and 16% men.

History
The Sisters of Mercy arrived in Pittsburgh on December 21, 1843. They traveled from County Carlow, Ireland to the Oakland area of Pittsburgh, where they purchased  within the Diocese of Pittsburgh. This land became the location of a new motherhouse and Our Lady of Mercy Academy. Some reports state that the site of the current campus was the location of a Civil War fortification named Fort Zug.

In 1929, the Sisters of Mercy opened Mount Mercy College. The first Commencement ceremony for Mount Mercy College was conducted in 1933. The college's seal and motto was also established that year. Aquinas Hall was built to house the library and administrative offices in 1936. Five years later, Trinity Hall opened as the science center for the college. In 1945, men were admitted to the school under the G.I. Bill. One of these men was the late Peter F. Flaherty, who went on to become a two-term Mayor of Pittsburgh and Allegheny County Commissioner.

In 1948, Antonian Hall opened with office, classroom, and theater space. Thirteen years later, in 1961, Frances Warde Hall dormitory was opened. Prior to this, students lived in houses or halls in the surrounding area. Mount Mercy College's name was changed to Carlow College in 1969. A year later, Curran Hall was renovated to house the nursing school. In 1975, Carlow's mission statement was drafted. In 1978, Carlow College went where few institutions of higher education had gone - accelerated classes especially designed for working adults.

In 2004, Carlow College officially became Carlow University and a year later appointed its first lay president, Dr. Mary Hines. In 2011, Carlow University was selected for the U.S. President's Community Service Honor Roll.

In the fall of 1983, Carlow began offering coed housing for men on-campus by housing  a single male student. In Fall 2012, Carlow began competition in men's and women's cross country, the first male sport offered at Carlow. Carlow announced on March 17, 2014 (St. Patrick's Day), that it would field a men's basketball team for the 2014–2015 season.

In September 2015, Carlow announced it would add men's soccer and men's and women's golf teams beginning in Fall 2016. In December 2016, Carlow announced that it would add men's and women's track and field teams beginning spring 2018.

Academic

Colleges
Carlow University is organized into two colleges:
 College of Arts and Sciences
 College of Health and Wellness

Campuses
Carlow University consists of three campuses, Oakland, Cranberry, and Greensburg. The main campus, the Oakland campus, is a 13-acre lot and consists of 14 buildings. Among them are Frances Warde Hall, Carlow's first dormitory. Frances Warde was one of the founding Sisters of Mercy in Carlow, Ireland.  Palumbo Hall of Science and Technology is the newest Carlow academic building.

Aquinas Hall is home to English, Spanish, Theology, History, Philosophy, and Women's Studies. Antonian Hall has a theater. St. Joseph's Hall has a gymnasium, dance studio, and weight room.

The Sisters of Mercy Convent is a Pittsburgh History and Landmarks Foundation Historic Landmark and motherhouse for nearly 150 Sisters of Mercy.

St. Agnes Church, dedicated in 1917, was designed by "nationally influential church-architect," John T. Comes. Masses are celebrated in the center on special occasions, such as the opening of a new academic year.

Athletics

The Carlow athletic teams are called the Celtics. The university is a member of the National Association of Intercollegiate Athletics (NAIA), primarily competing in the River States Conference (RSC; formerly known as the Kentucky Intercollegiate Athletic Conference (KIAC) until after the 2015–16 school year) since the 2012–13 academic year. They are also a member of the United States Collegiate Athletic Association (USCAA). The Celtics previously competed as a member of the American Mideast Conference from 2001–02 to 2011–12 (when the conference dissolved).

Carlow competes in 17 intercollegiate varsity sports: Men's sports include basketball, cross country, golf, soccer, track & field (indoor and outdoor) and volleyball; while women's sports include basketball, cross country, golf, soccer, softball, tennis, track & field (indoor and outdoor) and volleyball; and co-ed sports include cheerleading.

Move to NCAA Division III
In July 2022, Carlow was invited to join the Division III ranks of the National Collegiate Athletic Association (NCAA) and as a provisional member of the Allegheny Mountain Collegiate Conference (AMCC), starting in the 2023–24 academic year.

Basketball
After a brief hiatus in intercollegiate competition, the Carlow women's basketball program sprung back into action in 1990. The team competes in at least 26 competitions per season as a member of the American Mideast Conference.

The Carlow Celtics play their home games in Oakland Catholic High School. In addition, the Celtics have been recognized for academic success and have been ranked the Women's Basketball Coaches Association (WBCA) for academic success, placing in the NAIA's top 20 on numerous occasions while also earning individual honors as NAIA Scholar-Athletes. Men's basketball began in Fall 2014.

Soccer
Carlow University women's soccer team started competition in 1999–2000 and made a playoff appearance in 2000–2001. The team competes at Founders Field and at least 18 contests per season as a member of the American Mideast Conference. The 2016 season was the first for men's soccer.

Softball
Carlow University women's softball began as an intercollegiate sport at Carlow in 1997. The team entered its first year of American Mideast Conference competition in 2001. Although the team conditions year round, Carlow's official spring training begins in March when the team typically travels south to locations in Florida or South Carolina. Home games are played at Fairhaven Park or nearby Mazeroski Field. The team competes in at least 17 competitions per season as a member of the American Mideast Conference.

Tennis
Intercollegiate women's tennis competition has a long-standing history at Carlow. The program started in the 1980s which makes it Carlow's second oldest athletic program. The team competes in at least 10 competitions per season as a member of the American Mideast Conference. The tennis team play their home matches on the courts at Washington Landing.

Track & Field
Carlow fielded its first men's and women's track and field teams in the Spring of 2018.

Volleyball
Carlow University women's volleyball is the longest standing of Carlow's athletic programs. The team competes in at least 24 contest dates per season as a member of the American Mideast Conference. The Carlow Celtics volleyball team play their home games in St. Joseph Hall.

Notable alumni
 Peter Francis Flaherty, 54th Mayor of Pittsburgh Pennsylvania (D), 1970–1977

Notable faculty
 Jan Beatty, poet and radio personality
 Claudia Pinza Bozzolla, soprano singer and voice teacher
 Marylouise Fennell, president 1982–1989

See also 

 Victoria Nalongo Namusisi (awarded an honorary doctorate)

References

External links

 Official website
 Official athletics website

 

 
Former women's universities and colleges in the United States
Educational institutions established in 1929
Catholic universities and colleges in Pennsylvania
Sisters of Mercy colleges and universities
Universities and colleges in Pittsburgh
Liberal arts colleges in Pennsylvania
USCAA member institutions
Association of Catholic Colleges and Universities
River States Conference
1929 establishments in Pennsylvania